was an  destroyer of the Imperial Japanese Navy. Her name means "Winter Moon".

Construction and career
On 25 May 1944, Fuyutsuki was completed at Maizuru Naval Arsenal, and she was assigned to the 11th Destroyer Squadron, Combined Fleet.

On 24 June, she sailed to Yokosuka with Landing Ship No. 4 and Landing Ship No. 104. On 25 June, she escorted the I-Gō Transport Squadron, on 29 June, she was deployed to Chichi-jima with the cruiser  and destroyer . They returned to Yokosuka on 3 July.

On 11 July, she sailed to Tokuyama with the destroyer . On 14 July, she joined the Ro-Gō Transport Squadron, and sailed to Nakagusuku Bay. On 15 July, she was assigned to the 41st Destroyer Division, 10th Division, 3rd Fleet with the destroyer . Fuyutsuki returned to Kure on 26 July.

On 12 October, while escorting the light cruiser  from Yokosuka to the Inland Sea, she was hit in the bow by a torpedo fired from the submarine . She returned to Kure where she was repaired.

On 31 January 1945 she ran aground on a sandbar near Ōita during a training mission in the Inland Sea.

Fuyutsuki participated on the last mission of the battleship  (6–7 April 1945). She sank the crippled destroyer  with two torpedoes after taking aboard her crew. She was one of the few surviving ships, even though lightly damaged by 127 mm rockets and bombs. Her own losses were 12 dead and 12 injured.

On 20 August 1945, Fuyutsuki hit a mine at Moji, Kyūshū, suffering heavy damage to her stern. She surrendered unrepaired and without armament.

References

Notes

Sources
 

Ushio Shobō (Ushioshobokojinsha Co., Ltd.), Tōkyō, Japan.
The Maru Special, Imperial Japanese Vessels No. 19, Destroyer Asashio-class and Akizuki-class, 1978.
Senshi Sōsho, Asagumo Shimbunsha Inc., Tōkyō, Japan.
Vol. 31, Naval armaments and war preparation (1), "Until November 1941", 1969.
Japan Center for Asian Historical Records (http://www.jacar.go.jp/english/index.html), National Archives of Japan, Tokyo, Japan.
Reference code: C12070120400, October (1), Minister's Secretariat, Ministry of the Navy, 1943.
Reference code: C08030127400, Wartime log book from June 1, 1944 to June 30, 1945, 11th Torpedo Squadron (1), HQ of 11th Destroyer Squadron, Imperial Japanese Navy, 1944.
Reference code: C08030127500, Wartime log book from June 1, 1944 to June 30, 1945, 11th Torpedo Squadron (2), HQ of 11th Destroyer Squadron, Imperial Japanese Navy, 1944.

External links
CombinedFleet.com: Akizuki-class destroyers
CombinedFleet.com: Fuyuzuki history

Akizuki-class destroyers (1942)
World War II destroyers of Japan
1944 ships
Ships sunk as breakwaters
Ships built by Maizuru Naval Arsenal